Wickiup may refer to:

 Wigwam, a domed native American dwelling; wickiup is commonly used in the southwestern U.S.
 Wickiup, annual college yearbook published by Idaho State University, circa 1907–1981
 Wickiup Reservoir, second-largest reservoir in the U.S. state of Oregon located southwest of Bend in the Cascade Lakes

See also
Wikiup is an alternate spelling
 Larkfield-Wikiup, California, a census-designated location
 Wikieup, Arizona, an unincorporated community